Craig S. Henriquez (born c. 1959) is an American biomedical engineer, Professor of Biomedical Engineering and Computer Science at the Duke University, and is the co-founder and co-director of the Center for Neuroengineering. His research interests are in the areas of large scale computer modeling of the cardiac bidomain and neuroengineering.

Biography 
Henriquez received his BSE in Biomedical Engineering and Electrical Engineering in 1981 and a PhD in Biomedical Engineering in 1988 from the Duke University. His PhD thesis advisor was Robert Plonsey.

In 1989, Henriquez was appointed Research Assistant Professor in 1989, Assistant Professor in 1991, and Associate Professor in 1998 in the Departments of Biomedical Engineering and Computer Science at Duke University. In 2001, he was named the first Medtronics Visiting Professor of Virtual Electrophysiology, in the Department of Cardiology, University of Lausanne, Switzerland.

In 2003, he and Miguel Nicolelis founded and co-directed the Center for Neuroengineering where they developed a Brain Machine Interface in which electrode arrays were implanted into a monkey's brain that were able to detect the monkey's motor intent and thus able to control reaching and grasping movements performed by a robotic arm.

Henriquez was elected to serve as the chair the Duke University's Academic Council from 2009-2011. He is currently the James L. and Elizabeth M. Vincent Professor of Biomedical Engineering and served as the chairman of the Department of Biomedical engineering from 2011-2014.

Henriquez serves on several journal editorial boards

Awards 
 1992, Young Investigator's (FIRST) Award from the NIH 1997, 
 2001, the Bass Professor from Duke University . 
 2006, elected a Fellow of the American Institute for Medical and Biological Engineering.

Selected publications 
Articles, a selection

 .
 .

External links 
 http://www.bme.duke.edu/faculty/craig-s-henriquez

1959 births
Living people
American biomedical engineers
Duke University faculty
Fellows of the American Institute for Medical and Biological Engineering
Duke University Pratt School of Engineering alumni